Hussain Al-Sibyani (born 24 June 2001) is a Saudi Arabian professional footballer who plays as a left back for Pro League side Al-Shabab.

Career 
Al-Sibyani started at Al-Shabab's youth team and was promoted to the first team during the 2021–22 season. On 16 October 2021, Al-Sibyani made his professional debut for Al-Shabab against Abha in the Pro League, replacing Hattan Bahebri. On 31 January 2022, Al-Sibyani signed his first professional contract with the club.

Honours

International
Saudi Arabia U23
WAFF U-23 Championship: 2022

References

External links 
 

2001 births
Living people
Saudi Arabian footballers
Saudi Arabia youth international footballers
Association football fullbacks
Saudi Professional League players
Al-Shabab FC (Riyadh) players